This is a list of postmodern authors.



A 
 Kathy Acker 
 Peter Ackroyd
 Edward Albee
 Isabel Allende
 Martin Amis
 Gloria E. Anzaldúa
 Alberto Arbasino
 Fernando Arrabal
 John Ashbery
 Oğuz Atay
 Yusuf Atılgan
 Margaret Atwood
 Paul Auster

B 
 J. G. Ballard
 John Banville
 Amiri Baraka
 Julian Barnes
 John Barth
 Donald Barthelme
 Samuel Beckett
 Saul Bellow
 John Berryman
 Roberto Bolaño
 Jorge Luis Borges
 T. Coraghessan Boyle
 Giannina Braschi
 Richard Brautigan
 Christine Brooke-Rose
 Nicole Brossard
 Pascal Bruckner
 Gesualdo Bufalino
 Charles Bukowski
 Anthony Burgess
 William S. Burroughs
 Michel Butor
 A.S. Byatt

C 
 Pat Cadigan
 Italo Calvino
 Elias Canetti
 Mary Caponegro
 Angela Carter
 Raymond Carver
 Theresa Hak Kyung Cha
 Michael Chabon
 Caryl Churchill
 Hélène Cixous
 Chris Cleave
 John Maxwell Coetzee
 Brendan Connell
 Vincenzo Consolo
 Robert Coover
 Douglas Coupland
 John Crowley
 Mitch Cullin

D 
 Mark Z Danielewski
 Evan Dara
 Stefano D'Arrigo
 Lydia Davis
 Samuel R. Delany
 Don DeLillo
 Junot Diaz
 E. L. Doctorow
 J. P. Donleavy
 Margaret Drabble
 Marguerite Duras
 Bob Dylan

E 
 Umberto Eco
 Dave Eggers
 T.S. Eliot
 Bret Easton Ellis
 Louise Erdrich
 Péter Esterházy

F 
 Dan Fante
 Raymond Federman
 Amanda Filipacchi
 Dario Fo
 Jonathan Safran Foer
 Jonathan Franzen
 Carlos Fuentes
 Richard Foreman

G 
 Carlo Emilio Gadda
 William Gaddis
 Neil Gaiman
 William H. Gass
 Eckhard Gerdes
 William Gibson
 Allen Ginsberg
 John Giorno
 William Golding
 Nadine Gordimer
 Hedwig Gorski
 Jorie Graham
 Alasdair Gray
 Michael Grothaus
 Andrei Gusev

H 
 Jessica Hagedorn
 John Hawkes
 Brenda Hillman
 Siri Hustvedt
 Joseph Heller

I 
 Luce Iragaray
 John Irving
 Robert Irwin
 Christopher Isherwood
 Kazuo Ishiguro

J 
 Shelley Jackson
 Marlon James
 B. S. Johnson
 Lawrence Joseph

K 
 Metin Kaçan
 Ismail Kadare
 Richard Kalich
 Reza Khoshnazar 
 Danilo Kis
 László Krasznahorkai
 Sigizmund Krzhizhanovsky
 Milan Kundera
 Tony Kushner
 Jack Kerouac

L 
 Wally Lamb
 Doris Lessing
 Mark Leyner
 José Lezama Lima
 Tao Lin
 Clarice Lispector
 Patricia Lockwood
 Robert Ludlum
 Dimitris Lyacos
 Dominic Lyne
 Jonathan Lethem

M 
 Claudio Magris
 Dacia Maraini
 David Markson
 Gabriel García Márquez
 Yann Martel
 Carole Maso
 Cormac McCarthy
 Tom McCarthy
 Joseph McElroy
 Jon McGregor
 Czeslaw Milosz
 Alan Moore
 Grant Morrison
 Toni Morrison
 Alice Munro
 Haruki Murakami

N 
 Vladimir Nabokov
 Maggie Nelson
 Charu Nivedita
 Jeff Noon
 Alice Notley

O 
 Tim O'Brien
 Flannery O'Connor
 Michael Ondaatje
 Amos Oz

P 
 Chuck Palahniuk
 Orhan Pamuk
 Suzan-Lori Parks
 Nicanor Parra
 Milorad Pavić
 Victor Pelevin
 Georges Perec
 Cecile Pineda
 Richard Powers
 Terry Pratchett
 Thomas Pynchon

Q 
 Rexhep Qosja
 Raymond Queneau
 Ann Quin

R 
 Ishmael Reed
 Adrienne Rich
 Tom Robbins
 Philip Roth
 Salman Rushdie
 Joanna Russ

S 
 Mark SaFranko
 J. D. Salinger
 José Saramago
 George Saunders
 Ann Scott
 Will Self
 Elif Shafak
 Leslie Marmon Silko
 Charles Simic
 Isaac Bashevis Singer
 Zadie Smith
 Sasha Sokolov
 Vladimir Sorokin
 Art Spiegelman
 Neal Stephenson
 Ali Smith

T 
 James Tiptree Jr. (aka Alice Sheldon) 
 Pier Vittorio Tondelli
 Hasan Ali Toptaş
 Michel Tournier
 David Trinidad
 Anne Tyler
 Olga Tokarczuk

V 
 Enrique Vila-Matas
 William T. Vollmann
 Kurt Vonnegut

W 
 David Foster Wallace
 D. Harlan Wilson
 Jeanette Winterson

Y 
 Marguerite Young
 Kim Young-ha

Z 
 Yilin Zhong

See also
 List of postmodern critics
 List of postmodern novels
 Postmodern literature

References

 
Lists of writers